Íñigo Sainz-Maza Serna (born 16 June 1998) is a Spanish professional footballer who plays as either a right back or a midfielder for Racing de Santander.

Club career
Born in Ampuero, Cantabria, Sainz-Maza was a Racing de Santander youth graduate. He made his senior debut with the reserves on 21 February 2016, playing the last eight minutes in a 3–0 Tercera División away win over SD Gama.

Sainz-Maza scored his first senior goal on 21 October 2017, netting the opener in a 1–1 home draw against SD Solares-Medio Cudeyo. He made his first team debut on 19 May 2019, starting in a 2–2 home draw against UD Logroñés in the Segunda División B, as his club was already qualified to the play-offs.

On 20 August 2020, after Racing's relegation, Sainz-Maza signed his first professional contract with the club and was promoted to the main squad. He was a regular starter for the club during the 2021–22 campaign, scoring once and acting as team captain as his side achieved promotion back to Segunda División.

Sainz-Maza made his professional debut on 14 August 2022, starting in a 2–0 away loss against Villarreal CF B. Three days later, he renewed his contract until 2026.

References

External links

1998 births
Living people
Spanish footballers
Footballers from Cantabria
Association football defenders
Association football midfielders
Segunda División players
Primera Federación players
Segunda División B players
Tercera División players
Rayo Cantabria players
Racing de Santander players
People from Asón-Agüera